Grotesque is a 1988 horror film that was directed by Joe Tornatore. Linda Blair, who previously starred in The Exorcist, starred in the film and was the associate producer. It was filmed at Big Bear Lake.

Plot

A clearly disturbed woman offers herself to a deformed man in a cloak saying that he may kill her or have sex with her as long as he is quick. The man bites into her neck killing her. It is then shown that this scene was part of a screening of an upcoming film with the special effects being created by Orville Kruger (Guy Stockwell). Orville states to the producer of the film that he is going to his home in the San Bernardino Mountains after finishing this most recent project. Orville's daughter Lisa (Linda Blair) invites her friend Kathy (Donna Wilkes) to her parents home for the weekend so she can get over a recent breakup. On the way to the cabin, Lisa and Kathy are harassed by a gang of punks driving a Volkswagen van. The gang’s van breaks down and their leader, Scratch, demands that the van be fixed quickly. They are planning a home invasion robbery of Orville Kruger since they have heard rumors of something being kept hidden in the house which they assume to be valuables. Scratch also states that they shouldn't have a repeat of a previous robbery in Nevada where the gang slaughtered an entire family. Lisa and Kathy arrive at the house and are greeted by Lisa's mother who states that Lisa's uncle Rod (Tab Hunter) who is a plastic surgeon will be arriving the next day. After settling in, Lisa asks her mother how 'Patrick' is doing to which her mother states that he has his good days and bad days. While Lisa takes a shower, Kathy rests in the bedroom and a sea creature bursts into the room causing her to scream. It is then revealed that the sea creature is Orville in disguise and he has a habit of playing practical jokes using his special effects. Later that evening, during dinner Kathy shows interest in Orville's effects work and is shown to his study where several masks and props are on display. Orville states that he wonders if Kathy could really tell the difference between reality and illusion. While preparing for bed Lisa's mother says to Orville that she fed 'Patrick' and that it went well.

After going to bed, Lisa and Kathy are awoken by the gang dragging them out of bed and down stairs where they are also holding Orville and Lisa's mother hostage. They terrorize the family with threats of rape, torture, and murder if they do not show them where the hidden valuables are. Orville states that there are no valuables and in frustration they beat him to death with a log. Scratch then tells two other gang members to take Lisa's mother and have her show them where the valuables are. A set of eyes are shown watching the gang torment the family through a glass covered slot in the wall. While continuing to taunt Lisa and Kathy, the girls are able to get away briefly. Kathy comes across Lisa's mother who is dead by having her throat slit. Kathy is about to be raped when a female gang member stabs her to death instead. Lisa is caught and taken back to the living room and informed that her mother and friend are both dead and that she should tell them where the valuables are but she insists that there are none. In an act of desperation, Lisa jumps through a second story window and runs into the snow covered wilderness with a gang member in close pursuit. The rest of the gang decides to split up and ransack the house to find the valuables themselves and come across a hidden room decorated like a nursery. A hideously deformed man who had been locked in the room kills two gang members by crushing one in a bear hug and another by snapping her neck. The deformed man then cries at the body of Orville while sobbing, "Papa". The rest of the gang arrives and flees at the sight of the deformed man by running into the woods. The gang decides to split up into two groups of two so that there is less of a chance of them being caught by the deformed man. Two of the gang make their way to a mine shaft and build a fire to stay warm but are soon discovered by the deformed man who kills both with his bare hands. Scratch and his accomplice Shelley decide that they should fight the deformed man while trying to escape without the rest of the gang. Meanwhile, sunrise has come and Lisa is still being pursued through the wilderness by a gang member who is able to ambush her and strangle her. The deformed man arrives and kills the gang member but Lisa is unresponsive. A friend of the family arrives at the house, discovers the bodies and alerts the authorities. The police arrive and shortly after so does uncle Rod. The police question whether there were any enemies of Orville and if Lisa is a likely suspect. Acting under the assumption that whoever committed the murders couldn't have gone far since the van is still at the bottom of the hill and would most likely attempt to escape into the woods, the police form a posse to track down the perpetrators. The posse splits up to cover more ground and Lisa is discovered barely alive but unconscious. Meanwhile, the deformed man has come across Scratch and Shelley and attempts to kill them but is shot several times by Scratch. He is thought dead but when they move closer to inspect him, he attacks again. The posse arrives and seeing the deformed man attacking two people are about to shoot when Rod yells for them not to. They shoot the deformed man in the head and the two gang members are taken into custody.

Lisa is taken to the hospital and has a blood clot which they hope to remove but her chances are roughly 50/50 of surviving. Scratch and Shelley maintain a story that their vans radiator needed water and they went to the house looking for help when the deformed man appeared and began killing everyone. The police don't believe Scratch and Shelley since the van has an air cooled engine and wouldn't need water but can't prove that they are guilty of the murders. Lisa dies during the surgery and as the only witness to the home invasion, Scratch and Shelley are scheduled to be released. Rod explains to the police that the deformed man was an abandoned child named Patrick the Krugers took in and raised and would never do anything to hurt anyone. Rod is upset that the police can't act because of lack of evidence so he rents two surgical tables and procures a shotgun from an associate. When Scratch and Shelley are released and are waiting to be picked up by a friend, Rod forces them into his car by shotgun and makes them drive to the Krugers home. He forces them inside and into the hidden room where the two surgical tables are set up. He ties them down and explains that Patrick was his son who was born with physical deformities and mental deficiencies. Rod then reveals that he too has facial deformities and that his brother Orville used his special effects skills to make a mask that would allow him to live in society. Rod says that he is beautiful by comparison since they are truly ugly and that the room is sound proof so no one will ever hear them. Rod is then shown without his mask, sitting in a chair in the Krugers home, enjoying a drink while Scratch and Shelley having been surgically deformed, silently scream through the glass covered slot of the sound proof room. The events of the story are shown to once again be a preview screening of an upcoming movie with the cast watching in attendance. The film being shown ends abruptly and in the projectionists booth, the Frankenstein Monster and the Wolfman discuss the film. The Wolfman, having smashed the projector since it didn't accurately depict monsters while the Frankenstein Monster, states that the film is perhaps an 8 out of 10. They both agree to show everyone what real monsters are like and burst into the screening room causing everyone to scream and flee in terror. The film ends with the Frankenstein Monster and the Wolfman stating that they are still the best.

Cast 
 Linda Blair - as Lisa
 Tab Hunter - as Rod
 Donna Wilkes - as Kathy
 Guy Stockwell - as Orville Kruger  
 Brad Wilson - as Scratch 
 Nels Van Patton - as Gibbs 
 Charles Dierkop - as Matson
 Luana Patten -  as Old Lady  
 Robert Z'Dar - as Eric  
 Sharon Hughes - as Donna  
 Michelle Bensoussan  - as Shelly  
 Chuck Morrell  - as Jim Fulton  
 Lincoln Tate  as Blane  
 Bunky Jones  - as Belle  
 Bob Apisa  - as Patrick  
 Alva Megowan  - as Malinda  
 Ray Sterling  - as Pete  
 Tracy Hutchinson  - as Sandy  
 Don Tornatore  - as Ghoul 
Jeff Richard - as Wolf Mann  
 Stacy Alden  - as Young Lady 
 Chuck Foster  - as Hunter  
 Joe Tornatore  - as Charlie  
 Mike Lane  - as Frank N. Stien

Reception

Joe Corey, of Inside Pulse, wrote, "The movie gets weird with a rather arty finale about cinema and reality. This isn’t so much Grotesque as Perplexed". Stuart Galbraith IV, writing for DVD Talk, said that "the picture is a time-wasting jumble of half-baked ideas, overcooked performances (the actors playing punks are ridiculously overwrought throughout), and herky-jerky pacing".

Paul Pritchard, of DVD Verdict, wrote that "Grotesque makes yet another shift as it becomes an early entry into the torture porn genre, before ending in total farce, as it makes one final genre shift into comedy". A review in VideoHound's Cult Flicks & Trash Pics said that the film is "played too straight to be funny and too badly to be shocking".

Home media
Grotesque was released in a DVD set with three other low-budget films - Lady Frankenstein, The Velvet Vampire, and Time Walker. While the other films in the set have special features, this film does not. It is the only film in the set that is full frame, which a reviewer for DVD Talk said that it "appears to be an ancient video transfer, one that might even pre-date the dawn of DVD".

References

External links

1988 horror films
1988 films
Backwoods slasher films
American slasher films
1980s slasher films
Films shot in Big Bear Lake, California
1980s English-language films
1980s American films